The John Smith House is an Italianate-style house built in 1869 in Clinton, Wisconsin. In 1985 it was added to the National Register of Historic Places and in 1989 to the State Register of Historic Places.

The state's survey form calls the Smith house "one of the best and earliest Italianate houses in Clinton." It stands two stories, with brick walls on a foundation of rough-cut limestone. The windows' hoodmoulds are rounded. At the top of the wall is a frieze with paired brackets supporting broad horizontal eaves, a hallmark of Italianate style.

References

Houses on the National Register of Historic Places in Wisconsin
National Register of Historic Places in Rock County, Wisconsin
Houses in Rock County, Wisconsin
Italianate architecture in Wisconsin
Brick buildings and structures
Houses completed in 1869